The Blanchard Bridge, also known as Elm River Bridge, near Blanchard, North Dakota was a Pratt through truss structure that was built in 1900 by Dibley & Robinson.  It was listed on the National Register of Historic Places in 1997.  It was removed from the National Register in 2009.

The bridge was moved from its location in August 2007.

According to its nomination, it is significant "for its association with attempts by North Dakota counties to expand and improve transportation networks prior to 1926 by construction of through truss bridges, relatively costly structures. Through truss bridges with documented construction dates and builders, such as this one, best illustrate this important trend in North Dakota bridge construction."

References

Road bridges on the National Register of Historic Places in North Dakota
Bridges completed in 1900
Transportation in Traill County, North Dakota
National Register of Historic Places in Traill County, North Dakota
Pratt truss bridges in the United States
1900 establishments in North Dakota
Former National Register of Historic Places in North Dakota